Carposina hyperlopha is a moth in the Carposinidae family. It was described by Turner in 1947. It is found in Australia, where it has been recorded from New South Wales and Queensland.

References

Natural History Museum Lepidoptera generic names catalog

Carposinidae
Moths described in 1947
Moths of Australia